Case Closed: The Last Wizard of the Century, known as  in Japan, is a Japanese animated feature film based on the Case Closed series. It was released in Japanese theatres on April 17, 1999. FUNimation Entertainment acquired the rights to this film from TMS Entertainment on July 17, 2009 and released the dub in December 2009. This is the first film appearance of Vi Graythorn (Ai Haibara), Phantom Thief Kid (Kaitou Kid) and Harley Hartwell (Heiji Hattori).

Plot
The Phantom Thief Kid sends a heist notice, warning of another heist. The police deduce that his next target is a recently discovered Fabergé egg, which Suzuki Modern Art Museum in Osaka will display on August 22. The night of the heist, Kid steals the egg and flies off, and Conan and Heiji give chase. However, in the middle of the chase, an unknown assailant shoots Kid in the right eye, and Kid apparently falls into the sea to his death. After recovering the egg, the police fruitlessly search for Kid's body.

The next day, Conan, Ran, and Kogoro board a boat to Tokyo. They meet Natsumi Kousaka, whose great-grandfather worked in Fabergé's factory. She shows them a part of a sketch of two eggs and a key, which were found among her late grandmother's mementos. Conan suspects that the person who shot Kid is on the ship. That night, Ryu Sagawa, a freelance photographer covering the press with news of the egg, is murdered, shot in the right eye in the same fashion as Kid. Soon after his body is discovered, Inspector Megure, along with officers Takagi and Shiratori, arrive by helicopter to inspect the crime scene. At first, they suspect Sonoko's father's servant, Mr. Nishino, but the police and Conan conclude the culprit is Scorpion - a mysterious killer who always shoots his victims in the right eye. A missing lifeboat hints that Scorpion has escaped, and the boat's passengers go to Yokosuka Castle, which holds Scorpion's next target: the second egg.

While exploring the castle, the group stumbles across secret passages beneath the castle. As they traverse the tunnels, Inui, an art dealer, pursues a shadowy figure he sees in one of the tunnels, and is shot by a silenced handgun. Delving farther into the tunnel, they find a coffin with a corpse clutching the second egg. Suddenly, the two eggs are snatched away.

Conan deduces that Scorpion is Seiran the historian. She shoots her victims in the right eye to avenge her ancestor, Rasputin, whose body was found with an eye missing. Seiran attempts to kill Conan with her last bullet, but the bullet ricochets off the bulletproof glass on Conan's glasses he had Agasa install. As Conan kicks a rock, she reloads and is about to fire when a playing card knocks the gun out of her hands. Conan then knocks her out with the rock. Shiratori appears and carries Seiran out. Conan figures Shiratori is Kid in disguise. Back in Beika, Conan is about to confess to Ran that he's Shinichi, only to be interrupted by Kid, who is disguised as Shinichi and distracts Ran. Kid then disappears in a flurry of pigeons.

Cast
Characters listed with English names

Production

Music
Ending theme: "One" by B'z

Release

The Last Wizard of the Century was released in the U.S. December 29, 2009. Funimation owns the publishing rights for the English version.

In the popularity poll of 19 successive Case Closed films held in 2016, this work won the 7th place.

Home media

VHS
Detective Conan: The Last Wizard of the Century, was released on VHS on April 12, 2000 by Polydor Records.

Region 2 DVD
Polydor Records released the film in a DVD format on March 28, 2001. A new DVD was released on February 25, 2011, significantly lowering the original price and added the trailer as a special feature.

Region 1 DVD
Detective Conan: The Last Wizard of the Century was licensed by FUNimation Entertainment on July 17, 2009 under the name Case Closed - Movie: The Last Wizard of the Century. It was released straight to DVD on December 29, 2009.

Blu-ray
The Blu-ray version of the film was released on July 22, 2011. The Blu-ray contains the same content of the DVD plus a mini-booklet explaining the film and the BD-live function.

Reception
DVD Talk's Todd Douglass considers the film as one of Case Closed's better adventures and remarks the quality adventure and creative storyline, commenting on how they make the film more than an extended episode. Anime News Network's Theron Martin also viewed the film positively, despite having minor problems with lackluster artwork and little of the Phantom Thief Kid, he found the film accessible and said that it'll allow viewers to "enjoy the series at its best without having to wade through endless tracks of episodes."

References

External links
 
 

Last Wizard of the Century
1999 anime films
Films set in Osaka
Films set in Yokosuka
Films directed by Kenji Kodama
Funimation
TMS Entertainment
Toho animated films